Tule Creek is a river in Texas.

See also
 List of rivers of Texas
 Tule Creek (Temecula Creek), California

References

USGS Hydrologic Unit Map - State of Texas (1974)

Rivers of Texas
Tributaries of the Red River of the South